In geometry, the great cubicuboctahedron is a nonconvex uniform polyhedron, indexed as U14. It has 20 faces (8 triangles, 6 squares and 6 octagrams), 48 edges, and 24 vertices. Its square faces and its octagrammic faces are parallel to those of a cube, while its triangular faces are parallel to those of an octahedron: hence the name cubicuboctahedron. The great suffix serves to distinguish it from the small cubicuboctahedron, which also has faces in the aforementioned directions.

Orthographic projections

Related polyhedra 

It shares the vertex arrangement with the convex truncated cube and two other nonconvex uniform polyhedra. It additionally shares its edge arrangement with the nonconvex great rhombicuboctahedron (having the triangular faces and 6 square faces in common), and with the great rhombihexahedron (having the octagrammic faces in common).

Great hexacronic icositetrahedron

The great hexacronic icositetrahedron (or great lanceal disdodecahedron) is the dual of the great cubicuboctahedron.

See also 
 List of uniform polyhedra

References

External links 
 
 

Polyhedra